The Anthem of Aguascalientes, officially , is the official anthem of the Mexican state of Aguascalientes. It was composed by Esteban Ávila Mier, former governor, and music by Miguel Meneses on 1867.

Lyrics
Short version:

See also
Aguascalientes

References

Aguascalientes
Spanish-language songs
1867 songs